Confessor is an American doom metal band from North Carolina. By their technically complex interpretation of traditional doom style, they are also a well-known name within progressive metal circles. To date, the band has released two full-length studio albums.

Following the release of their 1991 debut album, Condemned, Confessor disbanded in 1994 while they were already planning a second album, but reformed in 2002 and are still active today.

Members
Current members
Scott Jeffreys – vocals (1986–1994, 2002–2009, 2011–present)
Chris Nolan – guitar (1994, 2006–present)
Marcus Williams – guitar (2013–present)
Cary Rowells – bass (1986–1994, 2002–present)
Steve Shelton – drums (1987–1994, 2002–present)

Former members
Shawn McCoy – guitar (2002–2006)
Ivan Colon – guitar (1990–1994; died 2002)
Graham Fry – guitar (1986–1990)
Jim Shoaf – drums (1986–1987)
Brian Shoaf – guitar (1986–1994, 2002–2013)

Timeline

Selected discography

References

External links
Official website
Confessor article at Earache.com
Confessor Interview at Earache.com
Confessor at Encyclopaedia Metallum

Musical groups established in 1986
Musical groups disestablished in 1994
Musical groups reestablished in 2002
Musical groups from North Carolina
American doom metal musical groups
American progressive metal musical groups
Earache Records artists
Season of Mist artists
1986 establishments in North Carolina